U-13 may refer to one of the following German submarines:

 , was the lead ship of the Type U 13 class of submarines; launched in 1910 and served in the First World War until sunk on 12 August 1914
 During the First World War, Germany also had these submarines with similar names:
 , a Type UB I submarine launched in 1915 and sunk on 24 April 1916
 , a Type UC I submarine launched in 1915 and grounded on 29 November 1915
 , a Type IIB submarine that served in the Second World War and was sunk on 31 May 1940
 , a Type 206 submarine of the Bundesmarine that was launched in 1973 and scrapped in 1997

Submarines of Germany